Gurvinder Singh Gill (also known as "Garry Gill") (born January 21, 1996) is an Indian professional basketball player.

He currently plays for the Punjab Steelers of India's UBA Pro Basketball League. He was a member of India's national basketball team at the 2015 FIBA Asia Championship in Changsha, Hunan, China.

References

External links
  
 
 
Fiba Profile
Eurobasket Profile

Indian men's basketball players
Living people
1996 births
Basketball players from Punjab, India
Forwards (basketball)